The 2011–12 Ekstraliga season was the 37th edition of the competition since its establishment. The Ekstraliga Kobiet (Polish for Extra League Women) is the top level women's football league of Poland.

Unia Racibórz were the defending champions, having won their third title in the previous season. MUKS Tomaszów Mazowiecki and KKP Bydgoszcz were promoted from the eastern and western group of the I liga having won their respective 2010–11 campaigns.

The campaign began on 13 August 2011. The winter break started after the 9th matchday (27-30 October). The first matches of the spring were held on 17 March. The campaign was concluded on 2 June 2012.

Each team played 18 matches. At the end of the season, the bottom two clubs were demoted to the I liga.

League table

Top goalscorers

References

2011–12 domestic women's association football leagues
2011–12 in Polish football